The Financial Monitoring Service of Azerbaijan is a public legal entity whose role is policy coordination, overall regulation, and supervision in the sphere of anti-money laundering and counter-terrorism financing in the country of Azerbaijan. According to its website, the Financial Monitoring Service was established by the Decree No. 66 of the President of the Republic of Azerbaijan, dated 23 February 2009.  The Financial Monitoring Service is the authority that implements the powers identified by the legislation on the prevention of illegally obtained funds and other property's use in the financing of terrorism in accordance with international standard.

The major purpose of the Financial Monitoring Service is to supervise compliance over the requirements of prevention of criminally obtained funds or other property and the financing of terrorism, as determined by the law of Azerbaijan. It also focuses on implementing policy and overall regulation in the relevant field as well as coordinate the activity of monitoring entities, other persons involved in monitoring, supervision authorities and other state authorities, overall providing for transparency and effectiveness.

History 
According to Decree No. 760 of the President of Azerbaijan, dated February 3, 2016, a legal entity of public law – the Financial Market Supervisory Authority of Azerbaijan was established and thus, the Financial Monitoring Service continued its activities as a structural division of the authority.

The Financial Monitoring Service was separated from the Financial Market Supervisory Authority by Decree No. 95 of the President of Azerbaijan, dated May 25, 2018. Currently, the Service continues to operate as a legal entity under public law.

According to Decree on amendments to the "Charter of the Financial Monitoring Service of the Republic of Azerbaijan" of the President of Azerbaijan, dated February 24, 2020, and approved by Decree No. 215 dated July 18, 2018, the Financial Monitoring Service began to operate under the Ministry of Economy of Azerbaijan in order to ensure the independence of its activities.

Rights of FMS 
FMS fulfils following functions in accordance with the scope of activities set forth by this Charter:

 Carries out monitoring in the relevant sphere, receives, collects and analyses information from monitoring entities, other persons involved in monitoring, as well as accessible or obtained from other known sources, and takes measures on the results.
 Adopts by-laws in the related field.
 Conducts effectiveness analysis of the situation in combating legalization of criminally obtained funds or other property and financing of terrorism, examines processes, develops proposals and recommendations.
 Adopts criteria (special indicators) for the detection of transactions subject to monitoring.
 Adopts regulation on submission of information as stipulated by the AML/CFT Law by monitoring entities and other persons involved in monitoring;
 Adopts simplified due diligence regulation as stipulated by the AML/CFT Law.
 Defines the list of transactions with funds and other property to be reported by monitoring participants to the Service and minimal threshold of their general amounts as stipulated by the AML/CFT Law.
 Approves and publishes the list of persons based on the United Nations Security Council Resolutions, as well as the legislation of the Republic of Azerbaijan and international treaties to which it is party, then communicates this list to the monitoring participants and other persons involved in monitoring directly or through the relevant supervision authorities.
 Defines and publishes the list of countries that are suspected in either legalization of criminally obtained funds or other property, financing of terrorism, support of the dangerous trends of transnational organized crime, armed separatism, extremism and mercenary, participation in illegal narcotic drug dealership and other psychotropic substances production or circulation thereof, and that do not require disclosing identification information when conducting financial transactions, then communicates this list to the monitoring participants and other persons involved in monitoring directly or through the relevant supervision authorities.
 Defines requirements on development of internal control systems established by monitoring entities and other persons involved in monitoring, which are legal persons, and establishes qualification requirements (professional specialization and experience) for persons responsible for organization of internal control systems.
 Conducts supervision over compliance with the AML/CFT Law by pawnshops and natural or legal persons that provide intermediary services on purchase or sale of real estate as well as determines regulations for conducting this supervision.
 Defines the form of submission of statistical information on the offences related to the legalization of criminally obtained funds or other property and the financing of terrorism, after being agreed with the related state authorities.
 Takes measures in accordance with the Code of Administrative Infringements of the Republic of Azerbaijan, when it finds out that there are signs of administrative violation in the operation carried out.
 Submits information on legalization of criminally obtained funds or other property to the General Prosecutor Office of the Republic of Azerbaijan, and information on the financing of terrorism to the State Security Service of the Republic of Azerbaijan and gets feedback from them.
 Obtain information on non–compliance of the monitoring entities and other persons involved in monitoring with the requirements of the AML/CFT Law, submits such information to the relevant supervision authorities for enforcement to these persons of administrative or stipulated by the legislation of the Republic of Azerbaijan other measures and gets feedback from them.
 Provide information on legalization of criminally obtained funds or other property, crimes committed to obtain such funds or other property or the financing of terrorism to relevant law enforcement and other state authorities in accordance with the legislation of the Republic of Azerbaijan and gets feedback from them.
 Conduct of inspections in accordance with the AML/CFT Law and receives reports.
 Send requests for information (documents) to state bodies and institutions, local self-governing bodies, legal entities and individuals, and receives such information (documents) from them.
 Study international experience in the relevant sphere and develops proposals on implementation of efficient methods and facilities, participates in implementation of international agreements to which the Republic of Azerbaijan is a party and ensures fulfillment of international obligations.
 Prepare statistic reports on the relevant field.
 Provide the monitoring entities and other persons involved in monitoring that are required to submit information, with adequate and appropriate feedback.
 Ensure effective intended usage of allocated to the Service budgetary funds, loans, grants and other financial resources.
 Provide an appropriate regime for the storage and protection of information which constitutes the state and commercial secrets or another secrets protected by law, as well as other official and/or confidential information obtained in the course of its activities.
 Store and protect archive documents in the manner prescribed by the law.
 Take into account international experience undertakes measures regarding application of modern information and communication technologies in the activity of the Service.

Management of the FMS 
The FMS is managed by the Executive Board, which carries out the management and supervision. The Executive Board consists of three persons – Chair of the Executive Board, two deputies appointed and dismissed by the President of the Republic of Azerbaijan. The term of the Executive Board is five years. 

The Executive Board carries out the following duties:

 determines the development directions for the FMS.
 presents suggestions and documents to the President of the Republic of Azerbaijan in order to implement the authorities of the founder.
 drafts the annual report regarding the activity of the FMS and presents it to the President of the Republic of Azerbaijan.
 reviews the draft legal acts related to improving the operations of the FMS, presents those drafts to relevant state authorities and institutions.
 ensures that the funds provided for in Paragraph 3.1.23 of the Charter are efficiently used.
 reviews the applications by the members of the Executive Board and makes decisions.
 approves the staff list within the frame of determined salary fund and number of employees, and the cost estimates within the allocated budget.
 approves internal regulations on the activity of the FMS, job descriptions and statutes of the structural units, taking into account Paragraph 4.7.6 of the Charter.
 determines the rules and conditions that exclude conflicts of interests in the activities of the Executive Board and staff, supervises over their implementation.

See also 
Ministry of Economy (Azerbaijan)

External Links 
 Official web-site of Financial Monitoring Service of the Republic of Azerbaijan

References 

Financial crime prevention
Terrorism in Azerbaijan
Anti-money laundering measures
Azeri intelligence agencies
2009 establishments in Azerbaijan